Below is a partial list of fellows of the Royal Society of Arts (formally, the Royal Society for the Encouragement of Arts, Manufactures and Commerce). A Fellow of the Royal Society of Arts is entitled to use the post-nominal letters FRSA after his or her name.

Fellowship
Fellowship is granted to applicants "who are aligned with the RSA's vision and share in our values." Some prospective fellows are approached by the RSA and invited to join in recognition of their work; some are nominated or "fast-tracked" by existing fellows and RSA staff, or by partner organisations such as the Churchill Fellowship; others make their own applications with accompanied references, which are reviewed by a formal admissions panel consisting of RSA trustees and fellowship councillors. As of 2022, the RSA has adopted an inclusive policy and stated that acceptance to the fellowship does not require the applicant to be "a leader in your industry or a CEO of an NGO".

Since its founding in 1754, the RSA Fellowship has grown to become an international community of 30,000 achievers and influencers from a wide array of backgrounds and professions, who are distinguished by the post-nominal letters FRSA. Fellows include social entrepreneurs, scientists, community leaders, commercial innovators, artists, journalists, architects, engineers, and many other occupations.

Charles Dickens, Adam Smith, Benjamin Franklin, Karl Marx, Richard Attenborough, William Hogarth, John Diefenbaker, Stephen Hawking, Benson Taylor and Tim Berners-Lee are some of the notable past and present Fellows, and today it has Fellows elected from 80 countries worldwide.

Major physical meetings of Fellows are held at RSA House, an 18th-century property in London. Regional meetings also take place. The RSA Fellowship maintains a collaborative online presence through the Fellowship's proprietary social network.

Fellows of the RSA

A 

 Mark Addis
 Julian Agyeman
 Sir Rodney Aldridge
 Enam Ali
 Sonita Alleyne
 Victor Ambrus
 Mohammed Amin
 Joyce Anelay, Baroness Anelay of St Johns
 Lorenzo Apicella
 Sara Arber
 Antony Armstrong-Jones, 1st Earl of Snowdon
 Timothy Garton Ash
 Paul Atherton
 Paul Atterbury
 John Ault

B 

 Iain Baikie
 Dame Janet Baker
 Ken Banks
 Muhammad Abdul Bari
 Barbara Barber
 Clive Barda
 Corelli Barnett
Reuven Bar-On
 Professor Richard Bartle
 Earl W. Bascom
 David Battie
 Patrick Baty
 Philip Bawcombe
 Ingrid Beazley
 Mark Beech
 John Belchem
 John Bell
 Giacomo Benedetto
 Anthony Benjamin
 Ralph Benjamin
 Gerald Bernbaum
 Sir Tim Berners-Lee
 Sir Michael Berry
 Christopher Bigsby
 Robert Black
 Sue Black
 Georgina Lara Booth
 Michael Blower
 John Bly
 Katalin Bogyay
 Emma Bossons
 Jonathan Bowen
 José Antonio Bowen
 Alex Boyd
 Tim Brain
 Dame Glynis Breakwell
 John David Brewer
 Dame Lynne Brindley
 Patricia Broadfoot
 Laurence Broderick
 Jeremy Broun
 Louise Burfitt-Dons
 John Burgan
 Saffron Burrows
 Steve Burrows
 Dame Alexandra Burslem
 Paula Byrne

C 

 Martin John Callanan
 Sir Colin Campbell
 Ian Campbell, 12th Duke of Argyll
 John Cannon
 Andrew Cantrill
 George Carey, Baron Carey of Clifton
 Elizabeth Carnegy, Baroness Carnegy of Lour
 William Carron, Baron Carron
 David Carter
 George Washington Carver
 Maie Casey, Baroness Casey
 Roger Cashmore
 Joseph Cassidy
 Hugh Cavendish, Baron Cavendish of Furness
 Andrew Cayley
 Carolina Ceca
 Mark Champkins
 Sylvia Chant
 Mike Chaplin
 Sir Frank Chapman
 Allan Chappelow
 David Childs
 Matthew Churchill
 Tony Christopher, Baron Christopher
 Roy Clare
 Brian Clarke
 Marcus Clarke
 Eileen Clegg
 Timothy Clement-Jones, Baron Clement-Jones
 Dave Cliff
 Brian Coleman
 Sir Timothy Colman
 Paul Condon, Baron Condon
 Douglas Connell
 Sir Francis Cook, 4th Baronet
 Sophie Cook
 Ida Copeland
 Andrew Copson
 Christian Cardell Corbet
 Frank Corner
 Donald Covington
 Elizabeth Craig
 Ted Craig
 Paul Crawford
 Christine Crawley, Baroness Crawley
 Freeman Wills Crofts
 Geoffrey Crossick
 Craig Crowley 
 Bobby Cummines
 Sir Philip Cunliffe-Owen

D 

 Miriam David
 George Davies
 Rupert Davies
 Sir Ed Davey
 Richard Digby Day
 Brenda Dean, Baroness Dean of Thornton-le-Fylde
 Sir Dermot de Trafford, 6th Baronet
 Edmund de Waal
 Graeme Dell
 Dame Judi Dench
 John Denham
 John Denison
 Simon Denny
 Nirj Deva
 Hilary Devey
 Hugh Welch Diamond
 Michael Dickson
 John Diefenbaker
 Rita Donaghy, Baroness Donaghy
 Danny Dorling
 Andrew Downes
 Madge Dresser
 Joseph Drew
 James Dugdale, 2nd Baron Crathorne
 Alfred Dunhill
 Sir Vivian Dunn
 John Dunston
 Bill Durodié
 Bob Dylan
 Mulalo Doyoyo
 Mischa Dohler
 Ambika Dhurandhar
 M. V. Dhurandhar

E 

 Ivan Edwards (physician)
 Dame Elizabeth Esteve-Coll
 Jonathan Evans
 Matthew Evans, Baron Evans of Temple Guiting
 Bernardine Evaristo

F 

 Sir Allen Fairhall
 Sir Donald Keith Falkner
 Lionel Fanthorpe
 Paul S. Farmer
 Mark Felton
 Donald R. Findlay QC
 Jerry Fishenden
 Anthony FitzClarence, 7th Earl of Munster
 Stephen Fleet
 Sir Roderick Floud
 Paul Flowers
 Daphne Foskett
 Sir Christopher Foxley-Norris
 Hywel Francis
 Barnett Freedman
 Arnold Friberg
 Plantagenet Somerset Fry

G 

 David Galloway
 Andrew Gamble
 Joss Garman
 Robert Garner
 Trixie Gardner, Baroness Gardner of Parkes
 Barney Gibbens
 David Gibbins
 Nigel Gilbert
 Pamela Gillies
 Ablade Glover
 Peter Goffin
 Derrick Gosselin
 Alex Graham
 James L. Gray
 A. C. Grayling
 Dame Beryl Grey
 Robert Melville Grindlay

H 

 Susannah Hagan
 Reginald George Haggar
 George Haig, 2nd Earl Haig
 John Robert Hall
 David Hallam
 James Hannigan
 Aaron Hape
 Molly Harrison
 James Harkness
 Dominick Harrod
 Adam Hart-Davis
 John Hartley
 Sir George Harvie-Watt
 Sir David Haslam
 Demis Hassabis
 Stephen Hawking
 Lucinda Hawksley
 John Hayes
 Clare Henry
 Saul Hayes
 James Hemming
 John Hemming
 Julian Henry
 Martin Henson
 Nicholas Herbert, 3rd Baron Hemingford
 Gill Hicks
 Chris Higgins
 Sir Graham Hills
 Peter Hinton
 Susie Hodge
 Mark Hodson
 Jonathan Holloway
 Gloria Hooper, Baroness Hooper
 Deian Hopkin
 Aida Hoteit
 James Archibald Houston
 David Russell Hulme
 Robin Hyman

I 

 Margaret Irwin
 Walter Isaacson

J 

 Alex James
 Bob Jeffery
 Peter Jonas
 Alan Jones
 Kirthi Jayakumar
 Philip Jones
 Thomas Brown Jordan
 Paul Judge
 Satvinder S. Juss

K 

 Andrew Karney
 Paul Karslake
 Kevin Keasey
 Stathis Kefallonitis
 Greta Kempton
 Helena Kennedy, Baroness Kennedy of The Shaws
 Alexander James Kent
 Julie Kent
 James Kerwin
 Anthony King
 Glenys Kinnock
 Jim Knight
 Angus Knowles-Cutler
 Philip Koomen
 David Kossoff
 Alfred Freddy Krupa

L 

 Hector Laing, Baron Laing of Dunphail
 John Laird, Baron Laird
 David Lammy
 John Large
 Michael Latham
 Abdul Latif
 James Laver
 Deborah Lavin
 Ruth Lea
 George Lee, 3rd Earl of Lichfield
 Lee Jinjoon
 Diane Lees
 Oliver Letwin
 Daniel Levitin
 Manuel Lima
 Tony Little
 John Lloyd
 Patricia Lovett
 Arthur Lowe
 Chris Luck
 Tzaims Luksus
 David Lumsden

M 

 Dickson Mabon
 David Mach
 Mavis Maclean
 Robin MacPherson
 Rachel Workman MacRobert
 Tom Maibaum
 Charles Robertson Maier
 Mahmoud Bukar Maina
 Amir Ali Majid
 Kenan Malik
 Gareth Malone
 Rogemar Mamon
 Arthur Mamou-Mani
 Peter Manning
 David Marquand
 Kevin Marsh
 Michael Marshall
 Arthur Marshman
 Doreen Massey
 Rod I. McAllister
 Murray McLachlan
 John McClelland
 Peter McCreath
 Alexander McDonnell, 9th Earl of Antrim
 Colin McDowell
 Ian McEwan
 John McIntosh
 Charles McKean
 Rosamond McKitterick
 Paul Mealor
 Tommy Miah
 Paul Michael
 Darren Millar
 Anthea Millett
 Greg Mills
 John W. Mills
 Madeleine Mitchell
 Jonathan Morgan
 Kevin A. Morrison
 Audrey Mullender
 Geoffrey Munn
 Turi Munthe
 Peter Murray
 Anton Muscatelli

N 

 Peter Nahum
 Simeon Nelson
 Elizabeth Neville
 Nick Newman
 Sarah Newton
 Edward Ng
 Steve Nimmons
 David Emmanuel Noel
 George Nugent, Baron Nugent of Guildford

O 

 Claire Oboussier
 Ken Olisa
 Philip and Andrew Oliver
 Harold M. O'Neal
 Iain Osborne
 Richard Ovenden

P 

 John Paddock
 Juliet Pannett
 Michael Paraskos
 Bhikhu Parekh
 Samit Patel
 Daphne Park, Baroness Park of Monmouth
 Philip Payton
 Dame Alison Peacock
 Charles Thomas Pearce
 Angier March Perkins
 Alan Pegler
 Matt Percival
 Richard Perham
 Stewart Perowne
 Bishnodat Persaud
 Barrie Pettman
 Vong Phaophanit
  Alison Phipps
 David Andrew Phoenix
 Gerald Pillay
 Alan Pipes
 Allan Pollok-Morris
 Jason Pontin
 Melissa Price
 Philip Priestley
 Ian Proctor

R 

 Ebony-Jewel Rainford-Brent
 Benjamin Ramm
 Andrew Rawnsley
 Alan Rayner
 Geoffrey Rees
 Seona Reid
 Michael Reiss
 Shai Reshef
 Susan Rice
 Sir John Riddell, 13th Baronet
 Keith Riglin
 Rosa Gumataotao Rios
 James Martin Ritchie
 Ken Ritchie
 Baron Goronwy-Roberts
 Nigel Roberts
 George Robertson, Baron Robertson of Port Ellen
 Duncan Robinson
 Sir Ken Robinson
 Sue Roffey
 Edina Ronay
 John Rose
 E. Clive Rouse
 Lindsay Roy
 Sir Ronald Russell
 Lloyd Russell-Moyle
 Shane Ryan

S 

 Srinivasa Ramanujan
 Alireza Sagharchi
 Caroline St John-Brooks
 Marina Salandy-Brown
 Constantine Sandis
 Teresa Ann Savoy
 Marjorie Scardino
 Matthew Schellhorn
 Winn Schwartau
 Steven Schwartz
 Sam Scorer
 Ernest Seitz
 John Sentamu
 Alok Sharma
 Kriti Sharma
 John Shaw
 Patrick Shea
 David Shepherd
 Denis Shipwright
 Steve Shirley
 Helena Shovelton
 Mona Siddiqui
 Andrew Sinclair
 Donald Sinden
 Jasvir Singh
 Paul Sinton-Hewitt
 Eugene Skeef
 Chris Skidmore
 Denis Smallwood
 Adam Smith
 Emma Smith
 Anick Soni
 Ralph Sorley
 Mike Southon
 John Speakman
 Paul Spicer
 Julian Stair
 Gilbert Stead
 Petra Štefanková
 Linda Joy Stern
 John Stevens, Baron Stevens of Kirkwhelpington
 Stewart Stevenson
 John Sunderland
 Richard Susskind
 David Sutton
 Philip Sutton
 Ian Swingland
 Antony G. Sweeney

T 

 Ralph Tabberer
 Daniel Tammet
 Benson Taylor
 James Taylor
 Iain Tennant
 Sir Gervais Tennyson-d'Eyncourt, 2nd Baronet
 D. D. Thacker
 Eric Thomas
 Martyn Thomas
 David Thomson
 Geoff Thompson
 Mildred Valley Thornton
 Lewis Thorpe
 Mike Tomlinson
 Anthony Trewavas

U 

 Peter Underwood
 Matthew Uttley

V 

 Iain Vallance, Baron Vallance of Tummel
 Paul Vaughan
 John Vereker
 David Verney, 21st Baron Willoughby de Broke
 Richard Veryard
 Herman Voaden
 Robert von Dassanowsky

W 

 David S. Wall
 Robert Walmsley
 David Warburton
 John Macqueen Ward
 Sarah Wardle
 Claire Watt-Smith
 Hilary Wayment
 Anthony S. Weiss
 Benjamin West
 Steve Wharton
 Tom Wheare
 David Wheeldon
 James Whitbourn
 Chandra Wickramasinghe
 Barbara Wilding
 Michael Wilford
 Alan Lee Williams
 Christopher Williams
 L. F. Rushbrook Williams
 Rorden Wilkinson
 Edward A. Wilson
 Edward Wilson
 Robert Winston
 Chris Wise
 Charles W. J. Withers
 John Wodehouse, 5th Earl of Kimberley
 Heinz Wolff
 Levison Wood
 Jim Woodcock
 Jeff Woolf
 Derek Wyatt

Y 

 William Yolland
 Douglas Young
 Jock Young

Z 

 Graham J Zellick
 Igor Zeiger
 Zhengxu Zhao

Historical members
The following have been members of the society historically:

A 

 Archibald Acheson, 6th Earl of Gosford
 Sarah Angelina Acland
 Kenneth Adam
 Robert Adam
 Barbara G. Adams
 Douglas Allen, Baron Croham
 John Arbuthnott, 16th Viscount of Arbuthnott
 Richard Arkwright
 William Armstrong
 Ellis Ashton
 Eric Auld

B 

 Reginald Poynton Baker
 Jeremiah Daniel Baltimore
 Earl W. Bascom
 John Frederick Bateman
 Leslie Banks
 Raymond Baxter
 Phil Belbin
 Gordon Beveridge
 John Boileau
 Gordon Borrie, Baron Borrie
 Jacob Bouverie, 1st Viscount Folkestone
 Druie Bowett
 Joyanne Bracewell
 Charles Bray
 Frederick Lee Bridell
 Isambard Kingdom Brunel
 Bryce Chudleigh Burt

C 

 Henry Cole
 Gladys Colton

D 

 Charles Dickens
 John Diefenbaker
 Joseph Drew

E 

 Cuthbert Hamilton Ellis

F 

 William Fairbairn
 Joshua Field
 John Fowler
 Sir Charles Fox
 Benjamin Franklin
 Sambrooke Freeman
 William Froude

G 

 Thomas Gainsborough
 Joseph Glynn
 John Viret Gooch
 Charles Greaves

H 

 John Hawkshaw
 John Hick
 William Hogarth

J 

 P. D. James

K 

 John Joseph Jolly Kyle

L 

 Robert Michael Laffan
 Joseph Locke

M 

 Guglielmo Marconi
 Charles Manby
 Enid Marx
 Karl Marx
 David Menhennet
 Matthew Murray

N 

Richard Lindsay Nicholson

P 

 Thomas Page
 Linus Pauling
 John Penn
 Robert Baden-Powell

R 

 Srinivasa Ramanujan
 John Urpeth Rastrick
 John Robinson McClean
 John Rennie
 Joshua Reynolds
 John Scott Russell

S 

 Edgar J. Saxon
 Gertrud Seidmann
 William Shipley, founder in 1754
 Carl Wilhelm Siemens
 James Simpson
 Adam Smith
 Robert Stephenson

T 

 John Richard Townsend

U 

 Peter Ustinov
 Edward Vernon Utterson

V 

 Cornelius Varley
 Charles Blacker Vignoles
 Vivian Virtue

W 

 Hilda Annetta Walker
 James Walker
 Joseph Whitworth
 William Wilberforce
 Edward Woods

References

Royal Society of Arts
Lists of British people
Royal Society of Arts, Fellows